Köyliö is a former municipality of Finland. It was merged to the municipality of Säkylä on 1 January 2016.

It was located in the Satakunta region.

The municipality was unilingually Finnish.

It is said that the peasant Lalli murdered the English bishop Henry on the ice of Lake Köyliö in 1156 AD, during the first Swedish Crusade into Finland. A statue to Lalli was erected at Köyliö in 1989.

Twinnings

Before the 2016 consolidation, Köyliö was twinned with;
 
 Nora, Sweden (1944)
 Kõo, Estonia (1991)
 Fladungen, Germany (1996)

References

External links
 
 Municipality of Köyliö – Official website

 
Municipalities of Satakunta
Former municipalities of Finland
Populated places established in 1870
Köyliö
1870 establishments in Finland